Whitehall Township may refer to the following places:

 Whitehall Township, Michigan
 Whitehall Township, Pennsylvania

There is also: 
 North Whitehall Township, Lehigh County, Pennsylvania
 South Whitehall Township, Lehigh County, Pennsylvania

See also

Whitehall (disambiguation)

Township name disambiguation pages